Conasprella iansa is a species of sea snail, a marine gastropod mollusk in the family Conidae, the cone snails and their allies.

Like all species within the genus Conasprella, these snails are predatory and venomous. They are capable of "stinging" humans, therefore live ones should be handled carefully or not at all.

Description
The size of the shell varies between 11 mm and 16 mm.

Distribution
This species occurs in the Atlantic Ocean off the Abrolhos Archipelago, Eastern Brazil

References

 Coltro, J. Jr. 2004. New species of Conidae from northeastern Brazil (Mollusca: Gastropoda). Strombus 11: 1–16.
 Puillandre N., Duda T.F., Meyer C., Olivera B.M. & Bouchet P. (2015). One, four or 100 genera? A new classification of the cone snails. Journal of Molluscan Studies. 81: 1–23.

External links
 The Conus Biodiversity website
 Cone Shells – Knights of the Sea
 

iansa
Gastropods described in 1979